Robert Dennis Chapman (born 18 August 1946), also known as Sammy Chapman is a footballer who played as a defender in the Football League during the 1960s and 1970s, most notably with Nottingham Forest.

Career
He made his debut for Forest in 1964 at the age of 17 years 5 months. At the time this made him the youngest ever Forest player. He made 422 senior appearances for the club and was club captain. He scored 23 Forest goals and was a regular starter even after the arrival of new manager Brian Clough during the 1974-75 season. In 1977 Forest won promotion back to the top flight. That was his last season at Forest.

He joined Notts County staying there for a year. He next moved to Shrewsbury Town for his last two seasons of senior football.

He moved to non-league Burton Albion before in July 1981 he joined Shepshed Charterhouse

Family
His son Robert has played cricket for Nottinghamshire County Cricket Club.

References 

English footballers
English expatriate footballers
English Football League players
North American Soccer League (1968–1984) players
Nottingham Forest F.C. players
Notts County F.C. players
Shrewsbury Town F.C. players
Tulsa Roughnecks (1978–1984) players
Burton Albion F.C. players
Shepshed Dynamo F.C. players
People from Aldridge
Living people
1946 births
Expatriate soccer players in the United States
Association football defenders
English expatriate sportspeople in the United States